The 2020 BMW PGA Championship was the 66th edition of the BMW PGA Championship, an annual golf tournament on the European Tour, which was originally due to be held 10–13 September at the West Course of Wentworth Club in Virginia Water, Surrey, England, a suburb southwest of London. On 28 May, the European Tour announced a new revised schedule in relation to the COVID-19 pandemic which rescheduled the tournament to 15–18 October. In August, the tournament was brought forward one week in the schedule to allow for culmination of a second, unofficial "UK Swing", starting with the Dubai Duty Free Irish Open and the Aberdeen Standard Investments Scottish Open. The tournament was played from 8–11 October.

Tyrrell Hatton won the tournament with a score of 269, 19-under-par, after a final round 67. He finished four strokes ahead of Victor Perez. Perez was 6-under-par after 12 holes of his final round but was 2-over-par for the remaining holes, finishing with a 68.

Course layout

Field

Past champions in the field

Made the cut

Missed the cut

Round summaries

First round
Thursday 8 October 2020

There was three-way tie after the first round, with Adri Arnaus, Justin Harding and Tyrrell Hatton each scoring 6-under-par 66. Defending champion Danny Willett scored 71.

Second round
Friday 9 October 2020

Matt Fitzpatrick and Shane Lowry each added a 7-under-par 65 to their opening rounds of 67, and shared the lead at the half-way stage. Fitzpatrick found water at the 8th, his final hole, and made a double-bogey 6. Tyrrell Hatton added a 67 to his first round 66 to lie in third place, a stroke behind. 67 players made the cut, at even par and better.

Third round
Saturday 10 October 2020

Overnight leaders, Matt Fitzpatrick and Shane Lowry, both had over-par rounds to drop down the leaderboard; Fitzpatrick scored 76 while Lowry took 74. Tyrrell Hatton took the lead after a round of 69, with Joachim B. Hansen and Victor Perez three strokes behind. Pablo Larrazábal had the best round of the day, coming home in 30 for a round of 66, while Tommy Fleetwood and David Horsey had rounds of 67 to move into a tie for 4th place with Lowry and Patrick Reed.

Final round
Sunday, 11 October 2020

Overnight leader Tyrrell Hatton won the tournament with a score of 269, 19-under-par, after a final round 67. He finished four strokes ahead of Victor Perez. Perez was 6-under-par after 12 holes of his final round but was 2-over-par for the remaining holes, finishing with a 68. Patrick Reed had an eagle at the final hole to finish tied for third place with Andy Sullivan, who had a final round 65. Ian Poulter finished fifth, with Eddie Pepperell in sixth place.

References

External links
Coverage on European Tour official site
Wentworth Club: Golf

BMW PGA Championship
Golf tournaments in England
BMW PGA Championship
BMW PGA Championship
BMW PGA Championship
BMW PGA Championship